Cambessedesia is a genus of flowering plants belonging to the family Melastomataceae.

Its native range is Brazil.

Species:

Cambessedesia angelana 
Cambessedesia atropurpurea 
Cambessedesia cambessedesioides 
Cambessedesia corymbosa 
Cambessedesia eichleri 
Cambessedesia espora 
Cambessedesia glaziovii 
Cambessedesia gracilis 
Cambessedesia harleyi 
Cambessedesia hermogenesii 
Cambessedesia hilariana 
Cambessedesia latevenosa 
Cambessedesia membranacea 
Cambessedesia pityrophylla 
Cambessedesia purpurata 
Cambessedesia regnelliana 
Cambessedesia rupestris 
Cambessedesia salviifolia 
Cambessedesia semidecandra 
Cambessedesia striatella 
Cambessedesia tenuis 
Cambessedesia tiradentensis 
Cambessedesia uncinata 
Cambessedesia weddellii 
Cambessedesia wurdackii

References

Melastomataceae
Melastomataceae genera